Schoenoplectus (club-rush [Old World species], bulrush or tule [New World species]) is a genus of plants in the sedges with a cosmopolitan distribution. Note that the name bulrush is also applied to species in the unrelated genus Typha as well as to other sedges. The genus Schoenoplectus was formerly considered part of Scirpus, but recent phylogenetic data shows that they are not closely related.

Species
Species accepted:
Schoenoplectus acutus (Muhl. ex J.M.Bigelow) Á.Löve & D.Löve – Tule – Canada, much of the United States; northern and central Mexico as far south as Michoacán; Clipperton Island.
Schoenoplectus americanus (Pers.) Volkart ex Schinz & R. Keller  – Chairmaker's bulrush, Olney's bulrush – Much of Western Hemisphere from Alaska to Argentina including West Indies; also New Zealand
Schoenoplectus annamicus (Raymond) T.Koyama – Vietnam
Schoenoplectus californicus (C.A.Mey.) Steud. – California bulrush, giant bulrush (Americas) – southern United States; California, Oregon; West Indies; Latin America from Mexico to Chile and Argentina; Falkland Islands; Easter Island
Schoenoplectus × carinatus (Sm.) Palla – Great Britain, Germany, Netherlands, Italy, Central Asia, Himalayas (hybrid S. lacustris × S. triqueter)
Schoenoplectus confusus (N.E.Br.) Lye – eastern and southern Africa
Schoenoplectus × contortus (Eames) S.G.Sm. – widely scattered locations in United States (hybrid S. americanus × S. pungens)
Schoenoplectus corymbosus (Roth ex Roem. & Schult.) J.Raynal in B.Peyre de Fabregues & J.P.Lebrun – widespread across much of Africa; Spain, Saudi Arabia, Yemen, India, Pakistan
Schoenoplectus decipiens (Nees) J.Raynal – southern Africa
Schoenoplectus deltarum (Schuyler) Soják – widely scattered locations in southern and central United States  
Schoenoplectus ehrenbergii (Boeckeler) Soják – European Russia, Gansu, Hebei, Ningxia, Shandong, Xinjiang, Kazakhstan
Schoenoplectus etuberculatus (Steud.) Soják – southeastern United States from Delaware to Texas – isolated populations in Missouri and Rhode Island
Schoenoplectus halophilus Papch. & Laktionov – southern European Russia
Schoenoplectus heptangularis Cabezas & Jim.Mejías – Bioko
Schoenoplectus heterochaetus (Chase) Soják  – Slender bulrush – Canada; northern and central United States, California
Schoenoplectus × kuekenthalianus (Junge) D.H.Kent – Great Britain; Ontario, Quebec, Oregon, Minnesota, New York, Vermont (hybrid S. tabernaemontana × S. triqueter)
Schoenoplectus lacustris  – Common club-rush, bulrush – Europe and Asia from Portugal to Sakhalin; North Africa; southern Africa; Eritrea, Yemen
Schoenoplectus litoralis (Schrad.) Palla – central and southern Europe; northern and central Africa; Comoros; Madagascar; southern Asia from Turkey and Saudi Arabia to China
Schoenoplectus monocephalus (J.Q.He) S.Yun Liang & S.R.Zhang – Anhui region of China
Schoenoplectus muricinux (C.B.Clarke) J.Raynal – central and southern Africa
Schoenoplectus muriculatus (Kük.) Browning – southern Africa
Schoenoplectus nipponicus (Makino) Soják – Japan, Korea, Manchuria, Russian Far East
Schoenoplectus × oblongus (T.Koyama) Soják – widely scattered locations in United States and Canada  (hybrid S. acutus × S. tabernaemontani)
Schoenoplectus paludicola (Kunth) Palla – South Africa
Schoenoplectus pulchellus (Kunth) J.Raynal – Lesotho, South Africa
Schoenoplectus pungens  – Sharp club-rush, three-square bulrush – widespread across North and South America, central Europe, Australia, New Zealand; apparently absent from Asia and Africa
Schoenoplectus rhodesicus (Podlech) Lye – Zaire, Tanzania, Zambia, Zimbabwe 
Schoenoplectus scirpoides (Schrad.) Browning – eastern and southern Africa
Schoenoplectus × steinmetzii (Fernald) S.G.Sm. – Maine and Wisconsin   (hybrid S. heterochaetus × S. tabernaemontani)
Schoenoplectus subterminalis (Torr.) Soják – eastern and western US and Canada, though mostly absent in central regions
Schoenoplectus subulatus (Vahl) Lye – scattered distribution across Africa, Asia, Australia, and some Pacific Island
Schoenoplectus tabernaemontani (C.C.Gmel.) Palla – virtually cosmopolitan
Schoenoplectus torreyi (Olney) Palla – eastern Canada, northeastern United States
Schoenoplectus triqueter (L.) Palla – Europe, Asia and North Africa from Ireland and Canary Islands to Japan; naturalized in Oregon and Washington

References

 
Cyperaceae genera
Taxa named by Eduard Palla